Forceful is a sea-going tugboat built for the Queensland Tug Company by Alexander Stephen and Sons Ltd in Govan, Scotland in 1925. She worked at her homeport of Brisbane, Australia between 1926 and 1970 berthing ships and assisting nearby casualties. During World War II she was commissioned into the Royal Australian Navy in early 1942 as HMAS Forceful (W126), based at Fremantle and Darwin, until returning to commercial service in October 1943. She is preserved as a museum ship at Brisbane.

Construction and commercial service
Forceful was built in 1925 by Alexander Stephen and Sons Ltd in Govan, Scotland as their yard number 509 for the Queensland Tug Company's operations at Brisbane, Queensland, Australia. Her steam engine, also made by the shipbuilder, is of triple-expansion type producing 1050 ihp and powering a single screw. The engine is fed by two single-ended coal-fired boilers each with 2 furnaces.

The tug was launched on 20 November 1925 and sailed from the River Clyde on 21 December, reaching Brisbane on 7 March 1926. After voyage repairs, she was registered at Brisbane on 31 March 1926 with Official Number 139366 and entered service in the port of Brisbane. In addition to her regular ship-berthing duties, she was deployed as required as a salvage tug on the Queensland coast.  After her naval requisition in World War II she resumed her service at Brisbane but in due course was overtaken by newer technology; by 1964 she was the last coal-burning steam tug on the River Brisbane. On 28 September 1970 she was retired from service and laid up.

Naval service
On 4 December 1941 Forceful was chartered by the British Ministry of War Transport for service in the Mediterranean as a salvage tug. After reaching Fremantle on 14 January, the charter was rescinded as the tug was required for service with the Royal Australian Navy. She was briefly an examination vessel before being requisitioned, and then commissioned as HMAS Forceful (pennant W126) on 16 February 1942. She was initially attached to HMAS Leeuwin, the naval base at Fremantle, for general harbour and towing duties.

In October 1942 Forceful was transferred to the naval base HMAS Melville, at Darwin, Northern Territory as a harbour and salvage tug. During her war service she was based at Darwin. She operated there during a period when Darwin received repeated Japanese air attacks. On 4 November the tug rescued the crew of an American B-26 bomber which had ditched west of Bathurst Island after a raid on Dili and in 1943 regularly took up salvage readiness at sea in support of naval destroyers during Australian irregular military operations in Timor. In April and May 1943 Forceful was based at Thursday Island in support of the strengthening of allied facilities at Merauke, New Guinea.

In August 1943 the tug returned from Darwin to Brisbane, where she was required as a harbour tug to assist the vastly increased volume of shipping. She was decommissioned from the Navy on 11 October 1943 and returned to her owners. HMAS Forceful received two battle honours for her wartime service: "Darwin 1942-43" and "Pacific 1943".

Museum ship
Forceful was retired from service in September 1970 and was handed over to the Queensland Maritime Museum in Brisbane on 10 June 1971. The vessel was kept operational and used for trips along the Brisbane River and to Moreton Bay until 2006, when a hull survey revealed that the tugboat was not safe to operate, and required extensive repairs. Despite further attention, in June 2012 Forceful was at risk of being condemned for scrap as a small leak had developed in the vessels stern. Forceful was given a deadline to be out of the water and repaired by Maritime Safety Queensland (MSQ). Anonymous funding was received to facilitate the required repairs and she returned to the Queensland Maritime Museum in July 2012.

Following a number repairs to the vessel at the Brisbane slipway in order to preserve her in a safe condition, Forceful is now  being maintained as a static exhibit at the Museum. She most recently re-opened to public tours in September 2018.

References

See also
 Forceful, Historic Naval Ships Association

Tugboats of the Royal Australian Navy
Tourist attractions in Brisbane
Museum ships in Australia
1925 ships
Tugboats of Australia
Ships built in Govan
South Brisbane, Queensland
Queensland in World War II
Steam tugs